Jan Klaasesz (5 February 1907 – 29 November 1997) was a Dutch politician for the Labour Party, who was Governor of Suriname between 1949 and 1956, and who was Queen's Commissioner of South Holland between 1956 and 1972.

External link

1907 births
1997 deaths
King's and Queen's Commissioners of South Holland
Governors of Suriname
Labour Party (Netherlands) politicians
Free-thinking Democratic League politicians
Mayors of Wageningen